Scopula consimilata is a moth of the family Geometridae. It was described by Warren in 1896. It is found in India (the Khasia Hills).

The forewings are ochreous, dusted thickly with blackish or fuscous. The lines are pale brown, the exterior line marked by black points on the veins. Adults have been recorded on wing from January to April.

References

Moths described in 1896
consimilata
Taxa named by William Warren (entomologist)
Moths of Asia